The 1919 Navy Midshipmen football team represented the United States Naval Academy during the 1919 college football season. In their third season under head coach Gil Dobie, the Midshipmen compiled a 7–1 record, shut out five opponents, and outscored all opponents by a combined score of 298 to 18.

After cancellation in 1917 and 1918 due to World War I, the annual Army–Navy Game was played on November 29 at the Polo Grounds in New York City; Navy

Schedule

References

Navy
Navy Midshipmen football seasons
Navy Midshipmen football